The Kraków Film Festival is one of Europe's oldest events dedicated to documentary, animation and other short film forms. It has been organised every year since 1961.

It was in Kraków that Polish filmmakers such as Krzysztof Kieślowski, Wojciech Wiszniewski, and Marcel Łoziński began their career.

Yet, such renowned documentary and animated filmmakers were not the only ones to participate and win prizes in Kraków, for the international festival laureates included also numerous artists who made their names as feature film directors: Pier Paolo Pasolini, Werner Herzog, Zoltán Huszárik, Jaromil Jireš, Claude Lelouch, Patrice Leconte, Mike Leigh, and the recent Oscar laureate, Jan Svěrák.

Since 1998, the Festival grants an international life achievement award called the "Dragon of Dragons". Its first laureate was Polish documentary maker . In 1999, the Prize was awarded to the classic Polish animator Jan Lenica. In 2000, the Dragon of Dragons Special Prize went to the French documentary maker Raymond Depardon. Future laureates include Jan Švankmajer (2001), Werner Herzog (2002), Stephen and Timothy Quay (2003), Albert Maysles (2004), Yuri Norstein (2005), and Kazimierz Karabasz (2006).

The unique character of the Kraków Film Festival derives not only from the programme of the competition screenings, the Dragon and Hobby Horse prizes awarded by an international and Polish jury, the Prix UIP Kracow, the FIPRESCI, and the FICC awards or numerous other prizes granted outside festival regulations, but also from the programme of accompanying events.

See also
 Cinema of Poland
 International Festival of Independent Cinema Off Plus Camera held in Kraków

References

External links
 The Krakow Film Festival Official website

Film Festival
Film festivals in Poland
Animation film festivals
Documentary film festivals in Poland
Short film festivals
Tourist attractions in Kraków
Film festivals established in 1961
1961 establishments in Poland
Annual events in Poland